Bruce Arnold may refer to:
 Bruce Arnold (author) (born 1936), English-born journalist and writer based in Ireland
 Bruce Arnold (jazz) (born 1955), American jazz guitarist and composer

See also
 Bruce Arnold Ackerman (born 1943), American constitutional law scholar